Rory O'Loughlin (born 21 January 1994) is an Irish rugby union player for Exeter Chiefs in England's Premiership Rugby, he previously played for Pro14 side Leinster and represented Old Belvedere in the Ulster Bank All-Ireland League. He plays primarily as a wing, though he can also play at centre.

Leinster
On 2 September 2016, O'Loughlin made his senior competitive debut for Leinster when he came off the bench in the sides opening 2016–17 Pro12 20–8 victory against Treviso in the RDS. On 17 December 2016, O'Loughlin made his European Rugby Champions Cup debut when he was a replacement in Leinster's 60–13 victory against Northampton Saints in Round 3 of the 2016–17 pool stage. On 6 January 2017, O'Loughlin scored a hat-trick against Zebre during Leinster's 70–6 win in the Pro12.

Exeter
In March 2022 O'Loughlin signed with the Exeter Chiefs for the 2022–23 season.

International
O'Loughlin earned his first cap for the Ireland national rugby union team in 2017. He previously played for the Ireland national rugby sevens team.

References

External links
Leinster Profile
Ireland Profile
Pro14 Profile

1994 births
Living people
Irish rugby union players
Leinster Rugby players
Rugby union wings
Rugby union centres
Rugby union players from County Dublin
Old Belvedere R.F.C. players
Ireland international rugby union players
Ireland international rugby sevens players
Alumni of University College Dublin
Expatriate rugby union players in England
Irish expatriate sportspeople in England
Irish expatriate rugby union players